Broken Hill is a city in western New South Wales, Australia.

Broken Hill may also refer to:
City of Broken Hill, the local government area containing the Australian city
Broken Hill ore deposit
Broken Hill mine
Broken Hill (film), a 2010 American film
Kabwe, a city in Zambia formerly known as Broken Hill
Kabwe 1 or the "Broken Hill skull", the type specimen for Homo rhodesiensis, an extinct human species discovered in and named for the place in Zambia.
Electoral district of Broken Hill, has twice been the name of an electoral district for the New South Wales Legislative Assembly
Broken Hill Hospital serves the city and district
Broken Hill railway station